A Night of Change is a 1935 German drama film directed by Hans Deppe and starring Gustav Fröhlich, Heinrich George, and Rose Stradner. It was made at the Grunewald Studios in Berlin. The film's sets were designed by the art director Fritz Maurischat and Karl Weber.

Cast

References

Bibliography
 
 Klaus, Ulrich J. Deutsche Tonfilme: Jahrgang 1933. Klaus-Archiv, 1988.

External links 
 

1935 films
1935 drama films
German drama films
Films of Nazi Germany
1930s German-language films
Films directed by Hans Deppe
German black-and-white films
1930s German films